Zamzar is an online file converter and compressor, created by brothers Mike and Chris Whyley in England in 2006. It allows users to convert files online, without downloading a software tool, and supports over 1,200 different conversion types. Since its formation, the service has converted over 510 million files for users from 245 different countries, including Antarctica. The service supports the conversion of documents, images, audio, video, e-Books, CAD files and compressed file formats.

 Users can type in a URL or upload one or more files (if they are all of the same format) from their computer; Zamzar will then convert the file(s) to another user-specified format, such as an Adobe PDF file to a Microsoft Word document. Once conversion is complete, users can immediately download the file from their web browser. Users can also choose to receive an email with a link to download the converted file.

In February 2021 Zamzar expanded their tool and announced a new file compression service. The compressor is visually similar to the conversion tool with a drag and drop download feature. As with the converter, users have the option to subscribe for a paid plan if they wish to compress multiple or larger files than the free service permits

File conversion API 
in 2015 Zamzar launched a file conversion API, allowing users to integrate file conversion capabilities into their own websites and applications. Sample code is provided to allow users to integrate file conversion capabilities in C#, Java, Node.js, PHP, Python and cURL. Zamzar also maintains a project on GitHub which allows users to perform file conversion from the command line on Linux, MacOS or Windows systems.

Email file conversion 
It is also possible to send files for conversion by emailing them to Zamzar. Zamzar launched this capability in 2012, allowing users to email files to dedicated email addresses for the file to be automatically converted to a different format. A link is then emailed back to the end user to allow them to download their converted file. For example, to convert a .doc attachment to .pdf users would simply email the file to pdf@zamzar.com.

Customers / User Privacy 
Zamzar does not publish lists of customers that use their services, but in 2019 they announced that Xerox Corporation would be using the Zamzar API to help power conversions in the Xerox Audio Document application. Users of Zamzar's services have access to both a Terms of Service document and a Privacy Policy. In April 2018 Zamzar announced their compliance with the General Data Protection Regulation (GDPR), and began offering a Data Processing Agreement (DPA), covering end user data rights and outlining Zamzar's contractual obligations to protect that data.

User privilege levels
Zamzar is currently free to use, but there is a limit of two conversions per day for files up to 50MB. Users can pay a monthly subscription in order to access preferential features, such as unlimited file conversions, online file management, shorter response and queuing times and other benefits.

Naming etymology
Its name comes from Franz Kafka's The Metamorphosis. Its main character is called Gregor Samsa and it is from his surname that Zamzar is derived. The founders of the service considered three other names Konvertieren, Khamailen and Obrogo before settling on Zamzar.

See also
 Brooklyn Bridge (software)

References

External links

Web applications
Video conversion software